The NWA Midwest Heavyweight Championship is the top professional wrestling title in the NWA Midwest promotion. The title has been in use since 2001. On November 1, 2011, the title was renamed Zero1 Pro Wrestling USA Midwest Heavyweight Championship, when NWA Midwest left the National Wrestling Alliance (NWA).

Title history

References

Heavyweight wrestling championships
National Wrestling Alliance championships
United States regional professional wrestling championships